The 1898 Tennessee gubernatorial election was held on November 8, 1898. Democratic nominee Benton McMillin defeated Republican nominee James Alexander Fowler with 57.92% of the vote.

General election

Candidates
Major party candidates
Benton McMillin, Democratic
James Alexander Fowler, Republican 

Other candidates
W. D. Turnley, People's
R. N. Richardson, Prohibition

Results

References

1898
Tennessee
Gubernatorial